Pantxi Sirieix (born 7 October 1980) is a French former professional footballer who played as a midfielder. Having begun at AJ Auxerre, he spent the rest of his career at Toulouse FC where he played from 2004 till 2017.

Career
Born in Bordeaux, Sirieix began playing professional football with Ligue 1 side AJ Auxerre.

After his contract ended, he joined Toulouse FC in 2004. The club's oldest and longest-serving player by 2012, he then extended his contract until 2014. On 18 May 2017, Sirieix announced his decision to retire at the end of the season.

Uncapped by France, Sirieix represented the Basque Country three times in unofficial appearances, being the only non-Spanish speaker in the squad on each occasion. Though born outside Greater Basque Country, he was eligible through his heritage and upbringing in the town of Hasparren in Labourd.

References

External links

TFC.info 

Living people
1980 births
Footballers from Bordeaux
Sportspeople from Pyrénées-Atlantiques
People from Labourd
French-Basque people
Association football midfielders
French footballers
Ligue 1 players
AJ Auxerre players
Toulouse FC players
Basque Country international footballers
Footballers from Nouvelle-Aquitaine